Mario Iceta Gavicagogeascoa (born 21 March 1965) is a Spanish prelate of the Catholic Church who has been Archbishop of Burgos since December 2020. He has been a bishop since 2008 and was Bishop of Bilbao from 2010 to 2020.

Education and early career

Mario Iceta Gavicagogeascoa was born on 21 March 1965 in Guernica, Spain. He studied at the University of Navarra from 1984 to 1990, earning a licentiate in medicine and surgery. After additional coursework in clinical pathophysiology from 1990 to 1992, he obtained a doctorate in bioethics and medical ethics in 1995. He studied philosophy and theology at the Faculty of Theology of Navarra from 1988 to 1992 and at the Seminary of Córdoba from 1992 to 1994 and received a bachelor's degree in theology at Comillas Pontifical University in 1994. He obtained a licentiate in moral theology (1999) and a doctorate (2002) at the John Paul II Pontifical Theological Institute for Marriage and Family Sciences.

Iceta was ordained a priest of the Diocese of Cordoba on 16 July 1994. He was member in solidum of the priestly group of Priego de Córdoba (1994-1997); Pastor of the Inmaculada Concepción of Almodóvar del Río (2002-2004); parish priest of Santo Domingo de Guzmán of Lucena (2004-2007); episcopal vicar of La Campiña (2004-2007); canon penitentiary (2005-2007); Professor of Sacred Liturgy, of Theology of the Sacraments, of Music and Liturgical Chant from 1994 to 1997 and of Moral Theology and Bioethics in the San Pelagio Major Seminary from 2002 to 2008.

Bishop and archbishop
Pope Benedict XVI appointed Iceta titular bishop of Alava and auxiliary of Bilbao on 5 February 2008. He received his episcopal consecration on the following 12 April.

On 24 August 2010, Pope Benedict named him Bishop of Bilbao. The Spanish Bishops Conference elected him a delegate to the Synod on the Family in October 2015. He was chosen to deliver the homily at the opening of the Synod's assembly on 24 October. He offered a meditation on prayer and evangelical humility.

On 6 October 2020, Pope Francis appointed him Archbishop of Burgos. He was installed there on 5 December.

References

External links
 
 https://www.catholic-hierarchy.org/bishop/biceta.html

Spanish Roman Catholic bishops
Living people
1965 births
Comillas Pontifical University alumni